Christine "Chris" Costner Sizemore (April 4, 1927 – July 24, 2016) was an American woman who, in the 1950s, was diagnosed with multiple personality disorder, now known as dissociative identity disorder. Her case, with a pseudonym used, was depicted in the 1950s book The Three Faces of Eve, written by her psychiatrists, Corbett H. Thigpen and Hervey M. Cleckley, upon which the film of the same name, starring Joanne Woodward, was based. She went public with her true identity in the 1970s.

Background
Sizemore was born Christine Costner on April 4, 1927, to Asa "Acie" Costner and Eunice Zueline Hastings in Edgefield, South Carolina.

In accordance with then-current modes of thought on the disorder, Thigpen reported that Sizemore had developed multiple personalities as a result of her witnessing two deaths and a horrifying accident within three months as a small child. However, in Sizemore's own report, these traumatic incidents only triggered the evidencing of selves which were already present: Despite authorities' claims to the contrary, my former alters were not fragments of my birth personality. They were entities, whole in their own rights, who coexisted with my birth personality before I was born. They were not me, but they remain intrinsically related to what it means to be me.

Diagnosis and The Three Faces of Eve 
Thigpen and Cleckley diagnosed Sizemore and treated her at no cost for several years. In 1956, while still under their care, she signed the rights to her life story to 20th Century Fox, although it was later alleged that she had signed this without legal representation and using the names of her alternate personalities.

The Three Faces of Eve became a bestseller when it was published in 1957. This was written by Thigpen and Cleckley with limited input from Sizemore.

In 1958 she co-wrote (with James Poling) Strangers in My Body: The Final Face of Eve, using the pseudonym of Evelyn Lancaster. She wrote two later follow-ups: I'm Eve (1977), written with Elen Sain Pittillo; and A Mind of My Own (1989).

In 1970 she started treatment with Tony Tsitos, whom she credited with making the greatest progress in integrating the divergent personalities over the next four years. According to both Sizemore and psychiatrists who worked with her after her treatment with Thigpen and Cleckley, it was not until she was in Tsitos' care that she became aware that she experienced not three selves, but more than 20 personalities that eventually were unified. It was reported that her selves were presented in groups of three at a time.

Sizemore reported feeling exploited and objectified by the media blitz surrounding the book and film of Three Faces of Eve. Upon discovering in 1988 that her legal rights to her own life story had been signed away to 20th Century Fox by Thigpen, Sizemore went to Manhattan's Federal District Court to contest the contract. She accepted an out-of-court settlement, and no further films were made.

Sizemore's papers, covering 1952 through 1989, have been acquired by the Duke University Library. An overview of the collection and a summary of Sizemore's story are included on its website.

Sizemore was interviewed on the BBC News channel series Hardtalk on March 25, 2009.

Death 
Sizemore died of a heart attack in hospice care on July 24, 2016, in Ocala, Florida. She was 89 years old.

See also

 The Three Faces of Eve
 List of autobiographers
 List of pen names
 List of people from South Carolina
 Shirley Ardell Mason

References

External links
 Chris Costner Sizemore, Patient Behind ‘The Three Faces of Eve’ - New York Times Obituary
 15 Years After Recovery, 'Eve' Enjoys the Best of Her 22 Personalities  - Article in Deseret News, Utah News organisation

1927 births
2016 deaths
20th-century American non-fiction writers
20th-century American women writers
21st-century American non-fiction writers
21st-century American women writers
American autobiographers
People from Edgefield, South Carolina

Pseudonymous women writers
Women autobiographers
Writers from South Carolina
People with dissociative identity disorder
20th-century pseudonymous writers
21st-century pseudonymous writers